Martina Jäschke (later Scheidewig then Fülle; born 6 May 1960 in Merseburg) is a German diver and Olympic champion. She competed at the 1980 Olympic Games in Moscow, where she received a gold medal in the 10 metre platform event.

References

External links 
 
 

1960 births
Living people
People from Merseburg
German female divers
Olympic divers of East Germany
Divers at the 1980 Summer Olympics
Olympic gold medalists for East Germany
Olympic medalists in diving
Medalists at the 1980 Summer Olympics
World Aquatics Championships medalists in diving
Sportspeople from Saxony-Anhalt
20th-century German women